The Life Science Library is a series of hardbound books published by Time Life between 1963 and 1967. Each of the 26 volumes explores a major topic of the natural sciences. They are intended for, and written at a level appropriate to, an educated lay readership. In each volume, the text of each of eight chapters is followed by a "Picture Essay" lavishly illustrating the subject of the preceding chapter. They were available in a monthly subscription from Life magazine. Each volume takes complex scientific concepts and provides explanations that can be easily understood. For example, Albert Einstein's theory of relativity is explained in a cartoon about a spy drama involving a train traveling very close to the speed of light; probability is explained with poker hands; and the periodic table of the elements is conveyed with common household items. Although progress has overtaken much of the material in the more than 50 years since their publication, the series' explanations of basic science and the history of discovery remain valid. The consulting editors of the series are microbiologist René Dubos, physicist Henry Margenau, and physicist and novelist C. P. Snow.

Each volume was written by a primary author or authors, "and the Editors of LIFE". The volumes are:

Matter (1963), by Ralph E. Lapp
Energy (1963), by Mitchell Wilson
Mathematics (1963), by David Bergamini
The Body (1964), by Alan E. Nourse
The Cell (1964), by John E. Pfeiffer
The Scientist (1964), by Henry Margenau and David Bergamini
Machines (1964), by Robert O'Brien
Man and Space (1964), by Arthur C. Clarke
The Mind (1964), by John Rowan Wilson
Sound and Hearing (1965), by S. S. Stevens and Fred Warshofsky
Ships (1965), by Edward V. Lewis and Robert O'Brien
Flight (1965), by H. Guyford Stever and James J. Haggerty
Growth (1965), by James M. Tanner and Gordon Rattray Taylor
Health and Disease (1965), by René Dubos and Maya Pines
Weather (1965), by Philip D. Thompson and Robert O'Brien
Planets (1966), by Carl Sagan and Jonathan Norton Leonard
The Engineer (1966), by C.C. Furnas and Joe McCarthy
Time (1966), by Samuel A. Goudsmit and Robert Claiborne
Water (1966), by Luna B. Leopold and Kenneth S. Davis
Giant Molecules (1966), by Herman F. Mark
Light and Vision (1966), by Conrad G. Mueller and Mae Rudolph
Food and Nutrition (1967), by William H. Sebrell, Jr and James J. Haggerty
The Physician (1967), by Russel V. Lee and Sarel Eimerl
Drugs (1967), by Walter Modell and Alfred Lansing
Wheels (1967), by Ezra Bowen
A Guide to Science and Index to the LIFE Science Library (1967)

See also
Life Nature Library

Science books
Time Life book series